Phocides pigmalion, the mangrove skipper, is a butterfly of the family Hesperiidae. It is found in the United States from coast to coast in peninsular Florida and the Florida Keys, south through the West Indies and Mexico to Argentina. Strays may be found up to coastal South Carolina.

The wingspan is 48–70 mm. Adults are on the wing from November to August in southern Florida.

The larvae feed on Rhizophora mangle species. Adults feed on nectar of various plants, including mangrove, shepherd's needle, citrus, and bougainvillaea flowers.

Subspecies 
 Phocides pigmalion pigmalion (Surinam, Colombia, Peru, Brazil)
 Phocides pigmalion bicolora (Haiti)
 Phocides pigmalion batabano (Cuba, tropical America)
 Phocides pigmalion okeechobee (Florida)
 Pocides pigmalion hewitsonius (Brazil (Amazonas), Peru, Bolivia)
 Phocides pigmalion batabanoides (Bahamas)

External links 

 Butterflies and Moths of North America
 Mangrove Skipper - Florida Wildflower Foundation

Eudaminae
Butterflies described in 1779
Hesperiidae of South America